Valentina Acosta (born July 23, 1982), is a Colombian television actress, presenter and model.

Filmography

Films

Television

References

External links 

1982 births
Living people
21st-century Colombian actresses
Colombian telenovela actresses
Actresses from Bogotá